Alaska is a 1944 American crime adventure film directed by George Archainbaud. It stars  Kent Taylor, Margaret Lindsay, and John Carradine.  The film has the alternative titles of JAck London's Alaska and Flush of Gold

Plot

Gary Corbett kills a pair of claim jumpers who did likewise to his father. He is charged with murder, but cannot be taken to Juneau to stand trial until the weather permits. Marshal John Masters keeps him in town until the prisoner can be moved.

Roxie Reagan, who sings at Tom LaRue's saloon, falls in love with Corbett, but she is trapped in a loveless marriage to John Reagan, an alcoholic has-been actor. LaRue also is in love with Roxie, and he and a local judge are suspected by Corbett of being in cahoots with the claim jumpers.

LaRue tries to frame Corbett for another murder, then sets the jail on fire. John Reagan courageously comes to Corbett's rescue, losing his own life in the process. The marshal deals with LaRue, but suddenly reveals that he is the one who has been backing the murderous claim jumpers all along. Corbett manages to get the better of Masters, then sets sail for San Francisco with his bride-to-be, Roxie.

Reception
TV Guide found the movie to be a low budget throwaway in which the cast of actors was wasted.

Production

While set in Alaska, the movie was filmed in Monogram Ranch, California.

Cast
 Kent Taylor as Corbett
 Margaret Lindsay as Roxie
 John Carradine as John Reagan
 Dean Jagger as Marshal Masters
 Nils Asther as Thomas Leroux
 Iris Adrian as Kitty
 George Cleveland as Pete - Postmaster
 Dewey Robinson as Nick
 Lee 'Lasses' White as 	Judge Mark Bennett
 John Rogers	Stumpy
 Earle Hodgins as Tobin 
 Glenn Strange as	Miner

See also
 List of American films of 1944

References

External links
 

1944 films
American crime films
American adventure films
1944 crime films
1944 adventure films
Films based on short fiction
Films based on works by Jack London
American black-and-white films
Films directed by George Archainbaud
1940s American films